"Punani" (stylized in all caps and censored as "P****i") is a song by American rapper 6ix9ine. It was released on August 2, 2020, alongside a music video, as the fourth single from his second studio album, TattleTales, released on September 4, 2020. The song was written by 6ix9ine, Andrew Green, Craig Parks, Jahnei Clarke and Jasper Harris and produced by the latter two.

The song is his first single ever to miss the Billboard Hot 100, only managing to reach number seven on the Bubbling Under Hot 100.

Release
On August 2, 2020, the track briefly appeared online in its entirety after it was accidentally posted on 6ix9ine's website before it was taken down a few minutes later. However, his team decided to release the official track later the same day, in attempts to stop leaks from hitting social media.

Music video
Unlike "Gooba", "Trollz", and "Yaya", the video for "Punani" was filmed outdoors in New York City following 6ix9ine's release from house arrest.

Personnel
 6ix9ine – vocals, songwriting
 Craig Parks – songwriting
 Jahnei Clarke – songwriting, arrangement, production
 Jasper Harris – songwriting, arrangement, production
 Wizard Lee – mixing, mastering
 Alex Solis – art direction, design

Charts

Release history

References

2020 songs
2020 singles
6ix9ine songs
Songs written by 6ix9ine